Agrahara may refer to places in India:

Karnataka, India

Bangalore Rural district
 Agrahara, Kanakapura

Bellary district
 Agrahara, Sandur

Chikmagalur district
 Agrahara, Kadur

Chitradurga district
 Agrahara, Holalkere
 Agrahara, Hosadurga

Hassan district
 Agrahara, Arkalgud
 Agrahara, Arsikere
 Agrahara, Channarayapatna

Kolar district
 Agrahara, Chintamani
 Agrahara, Malur
 Agrahara, Srinivaspur

Mandya district
 Agrahara, Shrirangapattana

Mysore district
 Agrahara, Hunsur
 Agrahara, Mysore, neighborhood in Mysore, India

Tumkur district
 Agrahara, Chiknayakanhalli
 Agrahara, Koratagere
 Agrahara, Sira